USS Howell Cobb was a schooner acquired on an emergency temporary basis by the United States Navy from the United States Coast Survey for service during the American Civil War. She served as a cargo ship in Union Navy service.

Service history 

Howell Cobb, a United States Coast Survey schooner operated as a survey ship, was taken over by the U.S. Navy on 10 June 1861 by Commander J. H. Ward, commanding the Union Navy′s Potomac River Flotilla. Her first commanding officer was Acting Master's Mate A. J. Frank. She was placed into Navy service as a cargo ship assigned to support the Potomac River Flotilla on the Potomac River.

Howell Cobb was actively employed on the Potomac River in convoys bringing supplies to the Union Army in and around Washington, D.C. This was vital service at a time when rail traffic north of Washington had been cut off by riots in Baltimore, Maryland. She also was engaged, in Breton's Bay and vicinity, in suppressing illegal trade along the shores of the Potomac.

She was sent to the Philadelphia Navy Yard in Philadelphia, Pennsylvania, for repairs, arriving there on 9 July 1862. She did not return to active service in the Civil War, and later was returned to the U.S. Coast Survey.

References

See also 

 Union Navy
 Confederate States Navy

Ships of the Union Navy
Schooners of the United States Navy
American Civil War auxiliary ships of the United States
Research vessels of the United States Navy
Stores ships of the United States Navy